Federico Murillo (born 4 January 1997) is an Argentine professional footballer who plays as a midfielder for Ferro Carril Oeste.

Career
Murillo began featuring for Ferro Carril Oeste from 2017. He made his senior bow on 25 June during a goalless draw against Villa Dálmine, after he had been an unused substitute on four previous occasions earlier in the 2016–17 Primera B Nacional season. Nine further appearances followed in his second campaign with the club.

Career statistics
.

References

External links

1997 births
Living people
Place of birth missing (living people)
Argentine footballers
Association football midfielders
Primera Nacional players
Ferro Carril Oeste footballers
21st-century Argentine people